The Municipality of Metlika is a municipality in the traditional region of Lower Carniola in southeastern Slovenia. The seat of the municipality is the town of Metlika. Metlika became a municipality in 1994.

Settlements

In addition to the municipal seat of Metlika, the municipality also includes the following settlements:

 Bereča Vas
 Boginja Vas
 Bojanja Vas
 Boldraž
 Boršt
 Božakovo
 Božič Vrh
 Brezovica pri Metliki
 Bušinja Vas
 Čurile
 Dole
 Dolnja Lokvica
 Dolnje Dobravice
 Dolnji Suhor pri Metliki
 Drage
 Dragomlja Vas
 Drašiči
 Geršiči
 Gornja Lokvica
 Gornje Dobravice
 Gornji Suhor pri Metliki
 Grabrovec
 Gradac
 Grm pri Podzemlju
 Hrast pri Jugorju
 Jugorje pri Metliki
 Kamenica
 Kapljišče
 Klošter
 Krasinec
 Krašnji Vrh
 Krivoglavice
 Križevska Vas
 Krmačina
 Mačkovec pri Suhorju
 Malo Lešče
 Mlake
 Okljuka
 Otok
 Podzemelj
 Prilozje
 Primostek
 Radoši
 Radovica
 Radoviči
 Rakovec
 Ravnace
 Rosalnice
 Sela pri Jugorju
 Škemljevec
 Škrilje
 Slamna Vas
 Svržaki
 Trnovec
 Vidošiči
 Želebej
 Železniki
 Zemelj

References

External links

Municipality of Metlika on Geopedia
Metlika municipal site

Metlika
1994 establishments in Slovenia